The Rules of the City of New York (RCNY) contains the compiled rules and regulations (delegated legislation) of New York City government agencies. It contains approximately 6,000 rules and regulations in 71 titles, each covering a different city agency. The City Record is the official journal of New York City. The rules can also be viewed and the public can comment on the city's rules website - NYC Rules.

See also 
 List of New York City agencies
 New York City Administrative Code
 The City Record
 Government of New York City
 New York Codes, Rules and Regulations
 Law of New York

References

External links 
 Rules of the City of New York from the New York City Department of Information Technology and Telecommunications
 Rules of the City of New York from American Legal Publishing Corporation
 NYC Rules from the New York City Department of Information Technology and Telecommunications

New York City law
Government of New York City